The fern genus Leptopteris is a small group of plants found growing in the Pacific Islands, New Guinea and Australia. They are similar to ferns in the related genus Todea, and were originally included in that genus. However, the very thin fronds of Leptopteris differ from the thick leathery fronds of Todea, and the genera are considered distinct. A probable extinct species, Leptopteris estipularis is known from the Early Cretaceous of India.

Species
Species include:
 L. alpina (Baker) C. Chr.
 †L. estipularis (Sharma, Bohra & Singh) Bomfleur, Grimm & McLoughlin
 L. fraseri (Hooker & Grev.) Presl (Crepe fern, Australia)
 L. hymenophylloides (Richard) Presl (Single crepe fern)
 L. x intermedia (André) Brownsey
 L. laxa Copeland
 †L. minuta Romanovskaja
 L. moorei (Baker) Christ
 L. superba (Colenso) Presl (Prince of Wales feather) 
 L. wilkesiana (Brack.) Christ

Phylogeny
Phylogeny of Leptopteris

References

Osmundales
Ferns of Asia
Ferns of Australasia
Fern genera